(born 10 August 1962 in Hamamatsu, Shizuoka) is a Japanese actor. He had major roles in several TV drama series such as Bayside Shakedown.

Kakei graduated from Osaka University of Arts.

Filmography

Television 

 Bayside Shakedown (1998, Fuji TV) as Kentaro Shinjo
 Dr. Coto's Clinic (2003–06, Fuji TV) as Kazunori Wada
 Ryōmaden (2010, NHK) as Miyoshi Shinzō 
 Naotora: The Lady Warlord (2017, NHK) as Nakao Naoyoshi

Film

 Bayside Shakedown (1998) as Kentaro Shinjo
 Bayside Shakedown 2 (2003) as Kentaro Shinjo
 The Suspect (2005) as Kentaro Shinjo
 Bayside Shakedown: The Final (2012) as Kentaro Shinjo
 The Next Generation -Patlabor- (2014, 2015) as Captain Keiji Gotōda
 Blood Friends (2019)
 Fullmetal Alchemist: The Revenge of Scar (2022) as Fu
 Fullmetal Alchemist: The Final Alchemy (2022) as Fu
 Dr. Coto's Clinic 2022 (2022) as Kazunori Wada
 Ginji the Speculator (2022)

Theater

 Miss Saigon (2004, 2008, 2014) as Engineer

References

External links 
  

Japanese male actors
1962 births
Living people
People from Hamamatsu
Osaka University of Arts alumni